This is a List of national sidecarcross champions, including the national championships of Belgium, Denmark, Estonia, France, Germany, Great Britain, Latvia, the Netherlands,Lithuania Sweden and Switzerland. Of those competitions listed, the Belgian Championship is the oldest one, dating back to 1951, followed by the French, formed in 1956.

Bold denotes, the team also won the Sidecarcross World Championship or one of its predecessor competitions, the FIM-Cup or FIM European Championship, in that season.

Belgium
The champions of the Belgian national championship, organised by the Fédération Motocycliste de Belgique:

The riders (passengers not included) with multiple championship wins, the number of championships they have won and in what era (first to last title):

Source:

Source:

Denmark
The champions of the Danish championship, organised by the Danmarks Motor Union:

The riders (passengers not included) with multiple championship wins, the number of championships they have won and in what era (first to last title):

Source:

Estonia
The champions of the Estonian championship, organised by the Eesti Mootorrattaspordi Föderatsioon:

Source:

France
The champions of the French championship, organised by the Fédération Française de Motocyclisme:

The most successful riders (passengers not included), the number of championships they have won and in what era (first to last title):

Source:

 1 Also used Marco Godau as his passenger.

Germany
A German national championship has been organised from 1974 onwards by the Deutscher Motor Sport Bund. Before that, from 1970, the OMSK-Pokal was considered to be an unofficial national championship and still continues to be organised, now under the name of DMSB-Pokal.

OMSK-Pokal

National championship
Organised since 1974 the German national championship was converted to an international one in 2007, allowing non-German riders to win it from then on:

The most successful riders (passengers not included), the number of championships they have won and in what era (first to last title):

Great Britain
The champions of the British championship, organised by the Auto-Cycle Union:

The most successful riders (passengers not included), the number of championships they have won and in what era (first to last title):

Source:
 1 Also used Dave Beavis as a passenger.
 2 Also used Barry Williams as a passenger.
 3 Also used Andreas Hüsser as a passenger.
 4 Also used Barry Williams & John Mitchelson as a passenger.
 5 Also used Barry Williams as a passenger.
 6 Also used Shane Skeats & Garry Withers as a passenger.
 7 Also used Garry Withers as a passenger.
 8 Also used David Keane as a passenger.
 9 Also used Jason Peters as a passenger.
 10 Also used Luke Peters as a passenger.
 11 Also used Marc Cooper as a passenger.

Latvia
The champions of the Latvian championship, organised by the Latvijas Motosporta Federācija:

Source:

Netherlands
The champions of the Netherlands sidecarcross championship, organised by the Koninklijke Nederlandse Motorrijders Vereniging:

The most successful riders (passengers not included), the number of championships they have won and in what era (first to last title):

Source:
 1 Also used Bart Notten as his passenger.
 2 Also used Henk Mensinck as his passenger.
 3 Also used J. van Vliet and D. Grootendorst as his passenger.
 4 Also used Frans Geurts van Kessel as his passenger.
 5 Also used Ron Varga as his passenger.
 6 Also used Reto Grütter as his passenger.

Sweden
The champions of the Swedish championship, organised by the Svenska Motorcykel- och Snöskoterförbundet:

The most successful riders (passengers not included), the number of championships they have won and in what era (first to last title):

Source:

Source:
 1 Also used Colin Dunkley as his passenger.

Switzerland
Two national sidecarcross championships exist in Switzerland, the championship of the SAM, the Schweizerischer Auto- und Motoradfahrer Verband, an amateur association, and the championship of the FMS, the FIM affiliated Fédération Motocycliste Suisse: Since 2002, the championship of the FMS has only been held once, in 2009.

FMS

The most successful riders (passengers not included), the number of championships they have won and in what era (first to last title):

Source:

SAM

See also
 List of FIM affiliated federations

References

External links
 The John Davey National Championship Pages
 Sidecarcross.de - Statistik/Hall Of Fame  Calendars and results of the German championship
 Website with links to motocross/sidecarcross websites 

Sidecarcross
National sidecarcross champions
Sidecarcross